The 1949 Open Championship was held at the Lansdowne Club in London from 22–27 April. Mahmoud Karim won his third consecutive title defeating  Brian Phillips in the final.

Seeds

Results

+ amateur
^ seeded

References

Men's British Open Squash Championships
Men's British Open Championship
Men's British Open Squash Championship
Men's British Open Squash Championship
Men's British Open Squash Championship
Squash competitions in London